The foreign relations of Yemen are the relationships and policies that Yemen maintains with other countries. It is a member of the United Nations, the Arab League, and the Organisation of Islamic Cooperation. Yemen participates in the nonaligned movement. The Republic of Yemen accepted responsibility for all treaties and debts of its predecessors, the YAR and the PDRY. Additionally, Yemen has acceded to the Nuclear Non-Proliferation Treaty and has stressed the need to render the Middle East region free of nuclear and other weapons of mass destruction.

History

North Yemen
The geography and ruling Imams of North Yemen kept the country isolated from foreign influence before 1962. During the 1920s, the government of Yemen forged relations with the Italian government under Mussolini, which led to the conclusion of an Italian-Yemeni friendship treaty on September 2, 1926. This gave the Sana'a government diplomatic support vis-a-vis the Saudi government, which had aggressive designs on Yemeni territory. The country's relations with Saudi Arabia were defined by the Treaty of Taif in 1934 which delineated the northernmost part of the border between the two kingdoms and set the framework for commerce and other interactions. The Taif Agreement has been renewed periodically in 20-year increments, and its validity was reaffirmed in 1995. Relations with the British colonial authorities in Aden and the south were usually tense.

The Soviet and Communist Chinese Aid Missions established in 1958 and 1959 were the first important non-Muslim presence in North Yemen. Following the September 1962 revolution, the Yemen Arab Republic became closely allied with and heavily dependent upon Egypt. Saudi Arabia aided the royalists in their attempt to defeat the republicans and did not recognize the Yemen Arab Republic until 1970. Subsequently, Saudi Arabia provided Yemen substantial budgetary and project support. At the same time, Saudi Arabia maintained direct contact with Yemeni tribes, which sometimes strained its official relations with the Yemeni government. Hundreds of thousands of Yemenis found employment in Saudi Arabia during the late 1970s and 1980s.

Saleh's foreign policy as the leader of North Yemen was characterized by the principles of "positive neutrality" and Arab unity. Under Saleh, Yemen cultivated close ties with Saudi Arabia and other pro-West states in the region. He also purchased military equipment from the United States and expanded economic relations with the West. At the same time, Saleh also tried to maintain friendly relations with the then-Soviet Union (which broke apart in 1991). In October 1984, he renewed the treaty of Friendship and Cooperation that was originally signed in 1964 by San'a and Moscow.

In February 1989, North Yemen joined Iraq, Jordan, and Egypt informing the Arab Cooperation Council (ACC), an organization created partly in response to the founding of the Gulf Cooperation Council, and intended to foster closer economic cooperation and integration among its members. After unification, the Republic of Yemen was accepted as a member of the ACC in place of its YAR predecessor. In the wake of the Persian Gulf crisis, the ACC has remained inactive.

South Yemen
British authorities left South Yemen in November 1967 in the wake of an intense resistance campaign. The People's Democratic Republic of Yemen, the successor to British colonial rule, had diplomatic relations with many nations, but its major links were with the Soviet Union and other Communist countries. Relations between it and the conservative Arab states of the Arabian Peninsula were strained. There were military clashes with Saudi Arabia in 1969 and 1973, and the PDRY provided active support for the Dhofar Rebellion against the Sultanate of Oman. The PDRY was the only Arab state to vote against admitting new Arab states from the Persian Gulf area to the United Nations and the Arab League. The PDRY provided sanctuary and material support to various international terrorist groups.

Unified Yemen
The Persian Gulf crisis dramatically affected Yemen's foreign relations. As a member of the UN Security Council (UNSC) for 1990 and 1991, Yemen abstained on a number of UNSC resolutions concerning Iraq and Kuwait and voted against the "use of force resolution". Western and Persian Gulf Arab states reacted by curtailing or canceling aid programs and diplomatic contacts. At least 850,000 Yemenis returned from Saudi Arabia and the Persian Gulf.

After the liberation of Kuwait, Yemen continued to maintain high-level contacts with Iraq. This hampered its efforts to rejoin the Arab mainstream and to mend fences with its immediate neighbors. In 1993, Yemen launched an unsuccessful diplomatic offensive to restore relations with its Persian Gulf neighbors. Some of its aggrieved neighbors actively aided the south during the 1994 civil war. Since the end of that conflict, tangible progress has been made on the diplomatic front in restoring normal relations with Yemen's neighbors. The Omani-Yemeni border has been officially demarcated. In the summer of 2000, Yemen and Saudi Arabia signed an International Border Treaty settling a 50-year-old dispute over the location of the border between the two countries. Yemen settled its dispute with Eritrea over the Hanish Islands in 1998.

Bilateral relations

International organization membership 
Yemen is a member of the United Nations (UN) and the following UN affiliates and specialized agencies:

Food and Agriculture Organization
International Civil Aviation Organization
International Fund for Agricultural Development
International Labour Organization
International Maritime Organization
International Telecommunication Union
UN Conference on Trade and Development
UN Educational, Scientific and Cultural Organization
UN High Commissioner for Refugees
UN Industrial Development Organization
Universal Postal Union
World Health Organization

Yemen is also a member of the following organizations:

Arab Fund for Economic and Social Development
Arab Monetary Fund
Council of Arab Economic Unity
Group of 77
International Atomic Energy Agency
International Bank for Reconstruction and Development
International Civil Aviation Organization
International Confederation of Free Trade Unions
International Criminal Court (signatory)
International Criminal Police Organization
International Federation of Red Cross and Red Crescent Societies
International Finance Corporation
International Monetary Fund
Islamic Development Bank
League of Arab States
Multilateral Investment Guarantee Agency
Organisation for the Prohibition of Chemical Weapons
Organisation of Islamic Cooperation
World Intellectual Property Organization
World Meteorological Organization
World Customs Organization

Yemen was granted observer status at the World Trade Organization (WTO) in 1999 and in 2002 and 2003 submitted necessary documentation for full membership. The WTO working party on Yemen met in 2004 and twice thereafter to discuss Yemen's accession; negotiations are expected to take several years.

Relations with the Gulf Cooperation Council
Yemen desires to join the 24-year-old Gulf Cooperation Council (GCC), a sub-regional organization which groups Saudi Arabia, Kuwait, Bahrain, Qatar, the United Arab Emirates, and Oman in an economic and security alliance. GCC members have traditionally opposed accession of additional states. Currently, Yemen has partial observer status on some GCC committees, and observers believe that full membership is unlikely. Others assert that it is in the GCC's interest to assist Yemen and prevent it from becoming a failed state, lest its instability spread to neighboring Gulf countries. This has helped Yemen greatly. In November 2006, an international donors' conference was convened in London to raise funds for Yemen's development. Yemen received pledges totaling $4.7 billion, which are to be disbursed over four years (2007–2010) and represent over 85% of the government's estimated external financing needs. Much of these pledges came from Yemen's wealthy Arab neighbors.

The impediments to full GCC membership are steep. Reportedly, Kuwait, still bitter over Yemen's support for Saddam Hussein during the first Gulf War, has blocked further discussion of membership. Meanwhile, Yemen needs to export thousands of its workers each year to the Gulf in order to alleviate economic burdens at home. Foreign remittances are, aside from oil exports, Yemen's primary source of hard currency.

Arab–Israeli conflict
Yemen has usually followed mainstream Arab positions on Arab–Israel issues, and its geographic distance from the conflict and lack of political clout make it a minor player in the peace process. Yemen has not established any bilateral mechanism for diplomatic or commercial contacts with Israel. The Yemeni Jewish community (300 members) continues to dwindle, as many of its members emigrated to Israel decades ago. On December 11, 2008, Moshe Nahari, a Jewish teacher, was murdered in a market in Raidah, home to one of the last Jewish communities in Yemen. After the attack, President Saleh pledged to relocate Yemeni Jews to the capital.

Yemen supports the Arab Peace Initiative, which calls for Israel's full withdrawal from all occupied territories and the establishment of a Palestinian state in the West Bank and Gaza Strip in exchange for full normalization of relations with all Arab states in the region. In the spring of 2008, President Saleh attempted to broker a reconciliation agreement between the competing Palestinian factions Hamas and Fatah. During a March meeting in Sana'a, Palestinian representatives from both groups signed a declaration (the Sana'a Declaration) calling for the creation of a national unity government, but the talks fell apart over the issue of Hamas's role in a unified Palestinian Authority.

Major international treaties
Yemen is a signatory to various international agreements on agricultural commodities, commerce, defense, economic and technical cooperation, finance, and postal matters. Yemen is a Non-Annex I country under the United Nations Framework Convention on Climate Change. Yemen is not a signatory to the Kyoto Protocol but has acceded to it, which has the same legal effect as ratification. Yemen is a signatory to the Nuclear Non-Proliferation Treaty, is a party to the Biological Weapons Convention, and has signed and ratified the Chemical Weapons Convention. Yemen is also a party to environmental conventions on Biodiversity, Desertification, Environmental Modification, Hazardous Wastes, Law of the Sea, and Ozone Layer Protection.

2010 embassy closures 
In late December 2009, the U.S. Embassy asked Americans in Yemen to keep watch for any suspicious terrorist activity following a terrorist incident on board a flight to the US that was linked to Yemen. On January 3, 2010, following intelligence and threats from al-Qaeda, the U.S. embassy in Sana'a was closed. A statement issued on the embassy's website said: "The US Embassy in Sana'a is closed today, in response to ongoing threats by Al-Qaeda in the Arabian Peninsula (AQAP) to attack American interests in Yemen". Al Jazeera reported that the closure of the embassy can mean only that "they believe al-Qaeda threat is very serious". No reopening date was given.

On the same day, the United Kingdom withdrew their presence in the country for similar purposes. The following day, France closed its embassy. Although the French Embassy was closed, staff remained inside.  The French foreign ministry issued a statement saying, "Our ambassador decided on January 3 not to authorise any public access to the diplomatic mission until further notice." At the Italian Embassy, only those with prior appointments were allowed to enter. Ambassador Mario Boffo noted, though, that "if things remain as they are, then tomorrow or the day after we will return to normality." The embassy of the Czech Republic closed the visa and consular departments "amid fears of terrorist attacks." Japan, South Korea, Spain and Germany also made changes to their security arrangements and embassy accessibility. In addition to extra security at embassies, Yemen increased security at Sana'a International Airport.

According to the BBC, Yemeni media say the embassy closures come after "six trucks full of weapons and explosives entered the capital, and the security forces lost track of the vehicles." Trucks driven by militants, previously under security surveillance, had entered Sana'a and lost the surveillance at that point.

The French, UK, and US embassies later reopened the following day.

2015 embassy closures
Following the 2014–15 Yemeni coup d'état, many nations closed their embassies. France, United Kingdom, and United States closed their embassies on 11 February 2015, Germany, Italy, and Saudi Arabia closed their embassies on 13 February, Spain, Turkey, and United Arab Emirates closed their embassies on 14 February, Japan closed its embassy on 16 February, and Egypt closed its embassy on 23 February.

See also
List of diplomatic missions in Yemen
List of diplomatic missions of Yemen
Visa requirements for Yemeni citizens

References